The 2022 Asian Karate Championships were the 18th edition of the Senior Asian Karate Championship and were held in Tashkent, Uzbekistan from 18 to 20, December 2022. The event was held at the Sport Complex Uzbekistan.

Medalists

Men

Women

Medal table

References

External links
 Results 
 WKF

Asian Karate Championships
Asian Championships
Sports competitions in Tashkent
Asian Karate Championships
Karate